John Wodehouse, 1st Earl of Kimberley  (7 January 18268 April 1902), known as the Lord Wodehouse from 1846 to 1866, was a British Liberal politician. He held office in every Liberal administration from 1852 to 1895, notably as Secretary of State for the Colonies and as Foreign Secretary.

Early life and education
Kimberley was born in 1826 in Wymondham, Norfolk, the eldest son of the Hon. Henry Wodehouse (1799–1834) and grandson of John Wodehouse, 2nd Baron Wodehouse. His mother was Anne Gurdon (d. 1880), daughter of Theophilus Thornhagh Gurdon. In 1846 he succeeded his grandfather as third Baron Wodehouse. He was educated at Eton and Christ Church, Oxford, where he took a first-class degree in classics in 1847.

Early career (1852–1874)
He was by inheritance a Liberal in politics, and in 1852–1856 and 1859–1861 he was Parliamentary Under-Secretary of State for Foreign Affairs in Lord Aberdeen's and Lord Palmerston's ministries. In the interval (1856–1858) he had been envoy-extraordinary to Russia; and in 1863 he was sent on a special mission to Copenhagen in the hope of finding a solution to the Schleswig-Holstein question. However, the mission was a failure.

In 1864 Kimberley became Under-Secretary of State for India, but towards the end of the year was made Lord Lieutenant of Ireland. In that capacity, he had to grapple with the first manifestations of Fenianism, and in recognition of his services, he was created Earl of Kimberley in 1866. In July 1866 he vacated his office with the fall of Lord Russell's ministry, but in 1868 he became Lord Privy Seal in Gladstone's cabinet, and in July 1870 was transferred from that post to be Secretary of State for the Colonies. It was the moment of the great diamond discoveries in southern Africa, and the town of Kimberley in the Cape Colony was named after him. Lord Kimberley has been credited with the change in British policy towards the independent Malay states that led to the signing of the Pangkor Treaty of 1874, after which British political agents known as Residents were placed in the Malay states as advisors to the rulers.

Later career (1875–1902)

After an interval in opposition from 1874 to 1880, Lord Kimberley returned to the Colonial Office in Gladstone's next ministry. He was in that office when responsible government was granted to Cape Colony, British Columbia was added to the Dominion of Canada and during the First Boer War. At the end of 1882 he exchanged this office first for that of Chancellor of the Duchy of Lancaster and then for the secretaryship of state for India, a post he retained during the remainder of Gladstone's tenure of power (1882–1885, 1886, 1892–1894), though in 1892–1894 he combined with it that of the lord presidency of the council.

In Lord Rosebery's cabinet (1894–1895) he was Foreign Secretary. During this time he signed the landmark Anglo-Japanese Treaty of Commerce and Navigation. Sir Edward Grey who served as Parliamentary Under-Secretary under Kimberley at the Foreign Office portrays him unfavourably as prolix and prone to irrelevant digressions in conversation although concise, definite and clear on paper. However, according to the Encyclopædia Britannica Eleventh Edition, "As leader of the Liberal party in the House of Lords he acted with undeviating dignity, and in opposition, he was a courteous antagonist and a critic of weight and experience".

Other public positions
On 5 April 1850, he joined the Canterbury Association, formed to establish a colony (in the later Canterbury Region) on the South Island of New Zealand.

Lord Kimberley took interest in education, and after being for many years a member of the senate of the University of London, he became its chancellor in 1899.

Family
Lord Kimberley married Lady Florence FitzGibbon (d. 1895), daughter of Richard FitzGibbon, 3rd Earl of Clare, on 16 August 1847. They had three children:

John Wodehouse, 2nd Earl of Kimberley (10 Dec 1848 – 7 Jan 1932)
Lady Alice Wodehouse (17 Dec 1850 – 8 Jan 1937) married Hussey Packe, son of George Hussey Packe on 14 August 1872. They had two children, Sir Edward, and Florence the wife of Lt.-Col. Cuthbert James.
Hon. Armine Wodehouse (24 Sep 1860 – 1 May 1901)

He died at 35 Lowndes Square in London (now the High Commission of Pakistan) on 8 April 1902, aged 76, and was succeeded in his titles by his eldest son, John. His more distant relations include the writer P. G. Wodehouse.

Ancestry

Memorials
The following places were named after the 1st Earl of Kimberley:
 the Kimberley region of Western Australia;
 Kimberley, a town in South Africa and;
 Kimberley, New Zealand, a hamlet of in the Selwyn District.
 Kimberley Road and Kimberley Street in Hong Kong
 Kimberley Street, George Town, Penang, Malaysia
 Kimberley Park, Falmouth, Cornwall
 County of Kimberley, a cadastral unit in South Australia.

Notes

References

 Burke and Burke (1847). A Genealogical and Heraldic Dictionary of the Landed Gentry of Great Britain and Ireland, volume 1 (London: Henry Colburn).
 Burke, J.B. (1858). A Genealogical and Heraldic Dictionary of the Landed Gentry of Great Britain and Ireland (London: Harrison).
 Hunter, J. and Clay, J.W. (ed.) (1895). Familiae Minorum Gentium, volume 3. (London: Harleian Society).
 Cokayne, G.E. (1892). Complete Peerage, 1st edition, volume 4 (London: George Bell and Sons; Exeter: William Pollard & Co.)
 Collins, A. (1779). [books.google.co.uk/books?id=zfk-AQAAMAAJ The Peerage of England], 5th edition, volume 6.
 Crisp, F.A. (1911). Visitation of England and Wales: Notes, volume 9 (printed privately).
 Wright, T. (1836). The History and Topography of the County of Essex, volume 1.
 Wroth, W.W. (1895). "Norris, John (1754-1777)", Dictionary of National Biography, volume 41.
Attribution:

External links

 
 
 

1826 births
1902 deaths
British Secretaries of State for Foreign Affairs
Lords Lieutenant of Ireland
Lord Presidents of the Council
Members of the Privy Council of the United Kingdom
Lords Privy Seal
Chancellors of the Duchy of Lancaster
Liberal Party (UK) hereditary peers
Alumni of Christ Church, Oxford
Chancellors of the University of London
Deputy Lieutenants of Norfolk
Knights of the Garter
11
Diplomatic peers
John Wodehouse, 1st Earl of Kimberley
Ambassadors of the United Kingdom to Russia
People from Wymondham
John Wodehouse, 1st Earl of Kimberley
Ambassadors of the United Kingdom to Denmark
Members of the Canterbury Association
Secretaries of State for India
Secretaries of State for the Colonies
Leaders of the House of Lords
Peers of the United Kingdom created by Queen Victoria
People educated at Eton College